Angel is a 1937 American comedy-drama film produced and directed by Ernst Lubitsch from a screenplay by Samson Raphaelson and Frederick Lonsdale. It was adapted by Guy Bolton and Russell Medcraft from the play Angyal by Melchior Lengyel. The music score was by Frederick Hollander, Werner R. Heymann and John Leipold with additional music by Gioacchino Rossini from The Barber of Seville. The cinematography was by Charles Lang and the costume design by Travis Banton. The film was distributed by Paramount Pictures.

The film stars Marlene Dietrich, Herbert Marshall and Melvyn Douglas with Edward Everett Horton, Laura Hope Crews and Herbert Mundin.

Plot

The story describes a love triangle initiated by Maria, Lady Barker (Dietrich), the wealthy but neglected wife of Sir Frederich Barker (Marshall), a top-level British diplomat.

Although her life is luxurious and Frederick loves her, he has been neglecting her in favor of pursuing his busy diplomatic career.  One day, when he is in Geneva on important business, she secretly flies to Paris to ask advice from her old friend, the Russian Grand Duchess Anna Dmitrievna, who operates a high-class escort business.  By chance, Maria meets Anthony Halton (Douglas), a charming man who has lived in India for several years. The salon was recommended to him by a friend. Although Maria insists that their liaison remain anonymous, they are attracted to each other, and they have a brief tryst, during which he calls her "Angel".  Intending to have only a simple fling, she tries to end the relationship by leaving him without saying good-bye.  However, he has fallen in love with her, and he begins searching for her.

At the races at Ascot, Maria spots Halton through her binoculars and goes home, pretending to have a headache. At a luncheon the following Saturday, Halton goes up to Frederick and reminds him that they are old “friends” from the Great War, who spent their Paris leaves with a girl named Paulette. Halton confides in Frederick, sharing all the details of his encounter with “Angel” and his obsession with her. The two of them make plans for Halton to have lunch with Frederick's wife, whose identity is heretofore unknown to Halton.

Maria is forewarned when Frederick tells her the story, thinking it will amuse her. Unable to avoid Halton any longer, Maria pretends not to recognize him when she meets him in her home. Halton has had a moment's warning: He sees Maria's photograph just before she comes downstairs. In a moment when Maria and Halton are alone together, she makes it clear to him that she has no interest in continuing their relationship and that she considers his presence a threat to her marriage and her reputation.  Still in love with her, he offers to meet her in Paris the following week, but she refuses.

Meanwhile, tickets have arrived for the vacation to Vienna that Frederick promised Maria earlier. Frederick has forgotten all about it, and decides to go to Geneva himself, although a capable man was  assigned to the mission. Even when he is reminded about the Vienna trip, he chooses to go to Geneva. Maria is crushed.

Frederick needs a private plane to ensure a long layover in Paris, and is shocked to learn that Lady Barker took a private plane there the week before. Maria asks Frederick to drop her off in Paris on his way to Geneva so she can go shopping. He asks no questions and conceals his suspicions from her, but goes to the Grand Duchess' salon to investigate. Maria appears. She is impressed by his jealousy—he wonders if she has been leading a double life—and the fact that he has missed the conference to find Angel.  She claims that Angel is another woman who is in an adjoining room, and asks him to believe her without looking. Why should she be Angel? What reason could she have?

Frederick enters the other room, which is empty. While he is there, Halton asks Maria to come with him. Frederick joins them. He says he has met Angel. He says he has thought more about their married life together in the last few minutes than in all the years before. He humbly tells her that the train for Vienna leaves at 10. He has said goodbye to Angel, and so must Maria. The camera follows him as he takes his hat from a side table. Then she steps into frame and he takes her arm. They walk out together without looking back.

Cast 
 Marlene Dietrich as Maria, Lady Barker, aka Mrs. Brown, aka “Angel”
 Herbert Marshall as Sir Frederick Barker
 Melvyn Douglas as Anthony 'Tony' Halton
 Edward Everett Horton as Graham, Sir Frederick's valet
 Ernest Cossart as Christopher 'Chris' Wilton, the Barkers' butler
 Laura Hope Crews as the Grand Duchess Anna Dmitrievna
 Herbert Mundin as Mr. Greenwood
 Dennie Moore as Emma MacGillicuddy Wilton

References

External links
 
 
 
 

1937 films
1937 comedy-drama films
American comedy-drama films
Paramount Pictures films
Films directed by Ernst Lubitsch
American black-and-white films
American films based on plays
Films scored by Friedrich Hollaender
1930s English-language films
1930s American films